Fatma Kachroudi (born 9 April 1976) is a Paralympian athlete from Tunisia competing mainly in category F37 discus events.

Fatma won a bronze medal in the F37 discus at the 2004 Summer Paralympics in Athens.  Four years later in Beijing she missed out on medals in both the F37/38 discus and shot put.

References

External links
 

1976 births
Living people
Tunisian female discus throwers
Paralympic athletes of Tunisia
Paralympic bronze medalists for Tunisia
Athletes (track and field) at the 2004 Summer Paralympics
Athletes (track and field) at the 2008 Summer Paralympics
Medalists at the 2004 Summer Paralympics
Paralympic medalists in athletics (track and field)
20th-century Tunisian women
21st-century Tunisian women